A Flower Above the Clouds is a 2019 Burmese romantic drama film, directed by Sin Yaw Mg Mg starring Ryu Sang Wook, Kyaw Htet Aung and Wutt Hmone Shwe Yi. The film was shot a joint venture between Myanmar and South Korea; produced by JBJ Entertainment and Big 5 Film Production premiered Myanmar on December 19, 2019.

Synopsis
Jae Won, who lives in Korea, came to Thantlang on the Chin Hills to do charity work.  At that time, it was a big movie to see what would happen between Jae Won and Hnin Sat in Thantlang.

Cast
Ryu Sang Wook as Jae Won
Kyaw Htet Aung as Htan
Wutt Hmone Shwe Yi as Snow, Hnin Sat
May Than Nu

References

2019 films
2010s Burmese-language films
Burmese romantic drama films
Films shot in Myanmar
2019 romantic drama films